Alex Esposito is an Italian bass-baritone opera singer, best known for singing Mozart roles, especially Leporello in Don Giovanni.

Esposito was born in Bergamo. He debuted at the Royal Opera in 2007 as Alidoro in La Cenerentola and sang Leporello in the 2008/09 and 2013/14 seasons, when he will also sing Figaro in Le nozze di Figaro.

Repertoire

References

Living people
Italian basses
Year of birth missing (living people)
Musicians from Bergamo